Vile Nilotic Rites is the ninth studio album by American technical death metal band Nile, released through Nuclear Blast on November 1, 2019. It is the band's only album with bassist Brad Parris and first with guitarist Brian Kingsland, the latter of whom replaced Dallas Toler-Wade in 2017. Two singles, "Long Shadows of Dread" and the title track, were released from the album. Nile toured North America throughout November and December 2019 in support of the record.

Background and recording
Drummer George Kollias called Vile Nilotic Rites a "special album for all of us since each member contributed on this a lot. I feel it represents the teamwork spirit Nile has right now and that shows on stage as well." The album was recorded at Serpent Headed Studios in Greenville, South Carolina.

The son of frontman Karl Sanders named Kael Sanders appears as a guest vocalist on the album, as well as several other guest vocalists.

Critical reception

The album was generally well-received by critics and fans alike. Writing for Metal Injection, Austin Weber noted that the most distinct difference about the album from the band's other albums is the "influx of what you might call more "traditional" tech-death lead-work taking a larger role here beyond their patented frenetic riff style".

Track listing

Personnel
Nile
 Karl Sanders – guitars, vocals, keyboards
 George Kollias – drums, percussion
 Brad Parris – bass, vocals
 Brian Kingsland – guitars, vocals

Additional musicians
 Mike Breazeale – guest vocal
 Joe Vesano - additional vocal
 Jason Hohenstein - additional vocal
 Joshua Ward - additional vocal
 Zach Jeter - additional vocal
 Loren Forester - additional vocal
 Kael Sanders - additional vocal
 Hunter Ross - additional vocal
 William Boyd - additional vocal
 Matt Arflin - additional vocal

Production and design
 Karl Sanders – production, recording
 Mark Lewis – mixing and mastering
 Jim Touras – engineering (drums)
 George Dovolos – engineering (drums)
 Brian Muniz – engineering (assistant)
 Michael "Xaay" Loranc – cover art, layout

Charts

References

2019 albums
Nile (band) albums
Nuclear Blast albums